The Sportzentrum Fischl is a soccer stadium in Klagenfurt.

It has a capacity of 3,000 people.

Currently the Red-Zac team FC Kärnten plays its home games in the stadium.

Football venues in Austria
Sport in Klagenfurt
FC Kärnten
Sports venues in Carinthia (state)